Princess Gaoyang (627 – 6 March 653) was the seventeenth daughter of Emperor Taizong of the Tang dynasty.

Early life

She was born into the imperial family. Her parents spoiled her and made sure she was well cared for; she had large rooms in the palace and many servants and attendants.

Affair with Bianji

In her late teens, Gaoyang had an affair with a monk named Bianji (辩机). They kept it well hidden for a number of years for two reasons: monks were not supposed to have intimate relationships, and the fact that Gaoyang was betrothed to a rich noble named Fang Yi'ai (房遺愛). After this time, Bianji was taken from the monastery and executed by hanging.

There are a lot of contradictions for this event, as it is recorded in New Book of Tang (新唐书) and Zizhi Tongjian (资治通鉴), both of which were made in Song Dynasty. All other records before the New Book of Tang never mention this event.

Firstly, according to the New Book of Tang (新唐书), relations between Princess Gaoyang and her father, Emperor Taizong had grown bitter, as Emperor Taizong ordered to kill Princess Gaoyang's Lover, Bianji. However, in the Old Book of Tang (旧唐书) which is written in Tang Dynasty, it is mentioned that when Gaoyang's father-in-law Fang Xuanling (房玄龄) was in last days of his life, he submitted a petition to Emperor through Gaoyang. The records mentioned that the conversation between Emperor and the Princess was still in great harmony. And also the Princess' name and courtesies were carved into Fang Xuanling's tomb with great honor.

Secondly, during the Tang Dynasty, there were strict rules for monks to have permission before leaving the monastery. Also, Bianji was later on appointed as 大德 by Xuanzang (玄奘), which is contradictory with the image of Bianji who arbitrary break the monastery rules.

And the last, numerous members of Fang Xuanling's clan held great positions in Tang Dynasty. There were a lot of ways to submit petitions to the Emperor if the event really happened.

Later years and death

Gaoyang became bitter after Bianji's death; her betrothal and wedding went as planned in spite of her protests. However, instead of animosity and resentment, Gaoyang and Fang Yi'ai grew closer and bonded over their mutual hatred for the imperial court. Gaoyang and her husband gathered an army and led a rebellion against her brother Emperor Gaozong and his wife Empress Wu. They stormed the palace but were stopped and captured. Gaoyang and her husband were executed by hanging shortly after.

In popular culture
 Portrayed by Ma Li in the 1995 Chinese TV series Wu Zetian.
Portrayed by Shen Aojun in the 2001 Chinese TV series Love Legend of the Tang Dynasty.
 Portrayed by Mi Lu in the 2014 Chinese TV series The Empress of China.

References

Tang dynasty princesses
Emperor Taizong of Tang
627 births
653 deaths
7th-century executions by the Tang dynasty
Forced suicides of Chinese people
7th-century Chinese women
7th-century Chinese people
Daughters of emperors